Fortified region or Fortified Region may refer to:

Fortified district, a fortification concept of the Soviet Army
Fortified district (Japan), a fortification concept of the Japanese Army
Fortified Region of Metz, France
Fortified region of Belfort, France